Federal Route 159, or Jalan Inderaloka, is a major federal road in Kuah town, Langkawi Island, Kedah, Malaysia.

Route background 
The Federal Route 159 was built under the JKR R5 road standard, allowing maximum speed limit of up to 90 km/h.

List of junctions and towns

References

Malaysian Federal Roads
Roads in Langkawi